Hughes Creek is a stream in Washington County in the U.S. state of Missouri. It is a tributary of Wallen Creek.

The stream headwaters arise north of Missouri Route 32 about 3.5 miles west of Bismarck and it flows to the north passing between Hughes Mountain and Round Mountain to its confluence with Wallen Creek two miles south-southwest of Irondale.

Hughes Creek has the name of the local Hughes family.

See also
List of rivers of Missouri

References

Rivers of Washington County, Missouri
Rivers of Missouri